Misadventures is the fourth studio album by American rock band Pierce the Veil released on May 13, 2016. The album serves as a follow-up to the group's third studio album, Collide with the Sky (2012). It was produced by Dan Korneff and was recorded throughout 2014 and 2015 in Long Island, New York.

Background

In an article by the Oakland Press, the band stated they had started writing new material together with Tom Denney whilst on tour with Mayday Parade, You Me at Six and All Time Low. The group finished writing new material after their winter European tour with British rock band Bring Me the Horizon in December 2013.

Tours 
From 2016 to 2017, Pierce the Veil embarked on seven concert tours to support Misadventures.

The Misadventures Tour 
The first tour in support of the album was The Misadventures Tour in the United States, in which the band played the album front to back at each performance. The tour began on June 5, 2016 in Las Vegas and ended on June 26, 2016 in Los Angeles. This was Pierce the Veil's eighteenth headlining tour overall.

South America/Mexico Tour 2016 
In Latin America, the album was toured with the South America/Mexico Tour 2016, beginning on July 10 in São Paulo and ending on July 17 in Guadalajara. There were no opening acts for this tour.

Australian Tour 2016 
The tour in Australia was titled Australian Tour 2016, beginning on August 16 in Brisbane and ending on August 23 in Perth. Beartooth, Silverstein and Storm the Sky were the opening acts.

Made to Destroy Tour 
The Made to Destroy Tour began on September 3, 2016 in San Francisco and ended on October 16, 2016 in Los Angeles. The support acts were I Prevail and Neck Deep.

U.K./Europe Tour 2016 
The tour in Europe was billed as the U.K./Europe Tour 2016. It began in Paris on October 29 and ended on December 6 in Dublin. Letlive and Creeper were the opening acts for all shows.

Rest in Space Tour 

The sixth tour for the album was the Rest in Space Tour in North America, which began on February 17, 2017 in Eugene, Oregon and concluded on March 10, 2017 in Tucson, Arizona. The opening acts were Falling in Reverse and Crown the Empire.

We Will Detonate! Tour 
The final tour in support of Misadventures was the We Will Detonate! Tour in the United States, which began on April 21, 2017 in Denver and ended on May 26, 2017 in Pryor Creek. Sum 41, Emarosa and Chapel appeared as support acts at all non-festival dates.

Writing and recording

In May 2014, Pierce the Veil started pre-production for the new record. On June 5, 2014, Tony Perry and Vic Fuentes announced that they would be flying to New Jersey to begin recording their new album with producer Dan Korneff.

The group decided to reunite with producer Dan Korneff to record the album, who also co-produced the band’s third album, Collide with the Sky. The band recorded the album at his Long Island studio in multiple sessions between the summer of 2014 and the summer of 2015. Vic Fuentes stated that “It was exciting to do another record with Dan [Korneff], we had gotten to know him really well on [our previous album], so there wasn’t that initial period where you’re trying to get to know each other. We just dove in and started to make music right away.” 

Commenting on the band's progression in songwriting ability, Vic Fuentes stated that “[Pierce the Veil] went into this record wanting to top the last one, which we try to do with every record, and we kept setting the bar higher and higher.”

Album title

When questioned by Rock Sound on the meaning behind the album's title, lead vocalist Vic Fuentes stated that "it sort of represents our lives over the last couple of years of making this record. All the different steps that were taken, the different places it took us. Places where we wrote, places where we recorded, places where we lived, every unexpected turn that this whole thing brought us. It was one of those things where you set out with a plan and you know that sometimes things don’t go the way that you planned. That’s sort of what happened. There were all these different, unexpected turns that came our way, and us trying to find the end of the album. That’s what that title represented."

Release

Plans for an upcoming album were initially announced on December 23, 2013 - the band released a holiday update announcing that they would have a new album coming out in 2014 again through Fearless Records.  In an interview with Alternative Press Vic Fuentes stated that the band was aiming for an early 2015 release date, pushed back from 2014. The reason for the pushed back release date was due to the band being several weeks behind due to two songs which the band wrote whilst they were recording the new album in the studio with producer Dan Korneff. In November and December, the group went on a co-headlining US with Sleeping with Sirens with support from Beartooth and This Wild Life. The band's ambitions for an early 2015 release date did not surface as the album was again pushed back for a later release in 2016. Between January and March, the group embarked on a second leg of their co-headlining US tour with Sleeping with Sirens. They were supported by PVRIS and Mallory Knox.

On June 18, 2015, the band released "The Divine Zero", the first single from the album.

On March 18, 2016, it was announced that the album would be released on May 13 through Fearless Records. The album was produced by Dan Korneff. The band released the second single from the album, "Texas Is Forever" on March 24, 2016.

On April 26, 2016, Pierce the Veil released the album's third single, "Circles", on BBC radio and announced that they were touring the UK and Europe later in 2016. The single was also released as a digital download.

On May 13, the band released Misadventures with a concert in West Hall Sports Palace, in Mexico City in front of 4,000 fans.

On November 17, the band released a music video for the album's first track, "Dive In", showing behind-the-scenes footage from their most recent tours.

Reception

Misadventures was met with critical acclaim, based on 5 critics, the album currently holds an 86 rating on Metacritic, signifying 'universal acclaim'.  Alternative Press gave it a 90/100 rating, and it quoted as stating: "Every single track is a winner. Misadventures expertly redraws PTV’s own map, celebrating their impossible blend of ambitious, creative obsessions and the electric crackle of raw intensity". 
Kerrang! Magazine stated "Misadventures has proudly claimed the belt as Pierce The Veil's best offering to date", giving it 80/100.

Peyton Bernhardt of Blunt Magazine gave the album 5/5 and wrote "listening to Pierce The Veil’s output should follow the same principle that the international mining industry does: the deeper you dig, the more value you’ll find. One run-through of this LP simply won’t do – there’s too much to discover."

Andy Biddulph of Rock Sound scored the album 8/10 and stated that 'Misadventures’ represents a rich, more polished version of the Pierce The Veil that broke out on 2012’s ‘Collide With The Sky’.

In addition Lisa Vanderwyk of Exclaim! gave the album 7/10 and praised Vic Fuentes for his performance stating that, "His crooning is familiar, but sharper now; he maintains stellar vocal performances throughout, dropping effortlessly from his head voice to guttural wails."

Track listing

Personnel

Pierce the Veil
 Vic Fuentes – lead vocals, rhythm guitar, keyboards
 Tony Perry – lead guitar
 Jaime Preciado – bass guitar, backing vocals
 Mike Fuentes – drums, art concept

Additional musicians
 Dave Yaden - all keyboards
 Curtis Peoples - gang vocals on "Circles" and "Today I Saw The Whole World"

Production
 Dan Korneff - producer, mixing, M chord and claps on "Dive In"
 Alex Prieto - engineering, digital editing, drum tech, guitar decimation on "Bedless"
 Matthew Kirby - engineering, digital editing, leslie guitar on "Today I Saw The Whole World"
 Nick Sferlazza - assistant engineering, M chord on "Dive In"
 Jim Romano - digital editing
 Ted Jensen - mastering at Sterling Sound, New York, NY

Management
 Michele Abreim - management
 Chris Foitle - A&R
 Jenny Reader - project management
 Dave Shapiro (United Talent Agency) - booking
 Tom Taaffe (United Talent Agency) - UK/Europe booking
 Rosemary Carroll (Carroll, Guido & Groffman) - legal representation
 Zeisler, Zeisler, Rawson & Johnson - business management

Artwork
 Mike Cortada - artwork and layout

Charts

Weekly charts

Year-end charts

Notes

References

2016 albums
Fearless Records albums
Pierce the Veil albums